This article serves as an index – as complete as possible – of all the honorific orders or similar decorations awarded by the British Crown, classified by Monarchies chapter and Republics chapter, and, under each chapter, recipients' countries and the detailed list of recipients.

Awards

Monarchies

British Royal Family 

Personal Aide-de-Camp (ADC) :
 The King : 1973 – : Personal Aide-de-Camp to the Queen (ADC)
Sir Tim Laurence : 1 August 2004 : Personal Aide-de-Camp to the Queen (ADC)
Mark Phillips :  ADC: Personal Aide-de-Camp to the Queen (Retired)
 The Duke of York : 1 February 1984: Personal Aide-de-Camp to the Queen (ADC)
 The Duke of Edinburgh : 1 August 2004: Personal Aide-de-Camp to the Queen (ADC)
 The Duke of Kent : Personal Aide-de-Camp to The Queen (ADC)
 The Prince of Wales : 17 March 2013: Personal Aide-de-Camp to the Queen (ADC)
 The Duke of Sussex : 13 October 2018: Personal Aide-de-Camp to the Queen (ADC)
 Orders :

In bold, when the member of the family is also Grand Master of the Order, next to the King as Sovereign of the Order
Rem : Grand Master =/= Sovereign, see article !

Counsellor of State :
 The Duke of York (since 1981 [2022])
 The Duke of Cambridge (since 2003 [2022])
 The Duke of Sussex (since 2005 [2022])
 The Queen (since 2022)
 Princess Beatrice, Mrs Edoardo Mapelli Mozzi (since 2022)
 The Princess Royal (since 2022)
 The Duke of Edinburgh (since 2022)
Her Majesty's Most Honourable Privy Council (PC) :
 William, Prince of Wales : 2016 – : Lord of His Majesty's Most Honourable Privy Council (PC)
 The Queen : 2016 – : Lady of His Majesty's Most Honourable Privy Council (PC)

European monarchies

Norwegian Royal Family 
See also decorations pages (mark °) : Harald, Sonja, Haakon, Mette-Marit, Mârtha Louise, Astrid & Ragnhild

Harald V of Norway:
 Stranger Knight of the Order of the Garter (2001)
 Honorary Freedom of Newcastle upon Tyne
 Royal Victorian Chain ° (1994) & Honorary Knight Grand Cross of the Royal Victorian Order (GCVO)

Swedish Royal Family  

Carl XVI Gustaf of Sweden : 
 Stranger Knight of the Order of the Garter (967th member, 1983)
 Recipient of the Royal Victorian Chain (1975)

Danish Royal Family 

Margrethe II of Denmark : 
 Stranger Lady of the Order of the Garter
 Honorary Dame Grand Cross of the Royal Victorian Order (GCVO) & Recipient of the Royal Victorian Chain

Dutch Royal Family 
 Princess Beatrix of the Netherlands :
 Stranger Lady of the Order of the Garter (975th Member, since 28 June 1989)
 Royal Victorian Chain (1982)
 Honorary Dame Grand Cross of the Royal Victorian Order (GCVO, 1982)
 King Willem-Alexander of the Netherlands :
 Stranger Knight of the Order of the Garter (1012th Member)

Belgian Royal Family 
King Albert II : 
 Honorary Knight Grand Cross of the Royal Victorian Order (GCVO)

Luxembourgish Grand-Ducal Family 
Henri, Grand Duke of Luxembourg :
 Honorary Knight Grand Cross of the Royal Victorian Order (GCVO)

Spanish Royal Family 
Juan Carlos I of Spain : 
 Stranger Knight of the Order of the Garter (974th member, England)
 Royal Victorian Chain
Felipe VI of Spain :
 Stranger Knight of the Order of the Garter (1009th member, England)
 Honorary Knight Grand Cross of the Royal Victorian Order (GCVO, 1988)

Asian monarchies

Jordanian Royal Family 
Queen Noor of Jordan : 
 Honorary Dame Grand Cross of the Venerable Order of Saint John (GCStJ, 16.6.1989) 
Abdullah II of Jordan  : 
 Honorary Grand Cross of the Order of the Bath, military class (GCB, 6.11.2001) 
 Honorary Grand Cross of the Order of St. Michael and St. George  (GCMG, 12.5.1999) 
 Honorary Knight Commander of the Royal Victorian Order (KCVO, 26.3.1984) 
Prince Ali Bin Al-Hussein, son of Queen Alia of Jordan, half-brother of Abdullah II of Jordan
 Honorary Knight Commander of the Royal Victorian Order (KCVO, 6.11.2001)
Prince Muhammad bin Talal, eldest younger brother of King Hussein I of Jordan
 Honorary Knight Grand Cross of the Royal Victorian Order (GCVO, 26.3.1984) 
Prince Hassan bin Talal, youngest brother of King Hussein I of Jordan
 Honorary Knight Grand Cross of the Royal Victorian Order (GCVO, 26.3.1984) 
 Princess Basma, sister of King Hussein
 Honorary Knight Cross of the Royal Victorian Order (GCVO, 6.11.2001) 
 Colonel Timoor al-Daghistani, Basma bint Talal's first husband
 Honorary Knight Grand Cross of the Royal Victorian Order (GCVO, 6.11.2001) 
 Sayyid Walid al-Kurdi, Basma bint Talal's second husband
 Honorary Knight Grand Cross of the Royal Victorian Order (GCVO, 6.11.2001)

Malaysia Royal Families

Pahang Royal Family 
Ahmad Shah of Pahang :
 Queen Elizabeth II Coronation Medal (1953)

Thai Royal Family 

 King Maha Vajiralongkorn of Thailand 
 Honorary Knight Grand Cross of the Royal Victorian Order
 Princess Maha Chakri Sirindhorn
 Honorary Dame Grand Cross of the Royal Victorian Order, 1996
 Princess Chulabhorn Walailak of Thailand 
 Honorary Dame Grand Cross of the Royal Victorian Order, 1996

Japanese Imperial Family 

Emperor Akihito: 
 Stranger 984th Knight of Order of the Garter
 Honorary Knight Grand Cross of the Royal Victorian Order
 Queen Elizabeth II Coronation Medal

Tongan Royal Family 
 King Tupou VI (2012-): 
 Honorary Knight Grand Cross of the Order of St Michael and St George (GCMG)
 Honorary Knight Grand Cross of the Royal Victorian Order (GCVO)
 Honorary Knight of Justice of the Venerable Order of Saint John (KStJ)
 Honorary Knight Commander of the Order of the British Empire (KBE)
  Major Sosi'ua Ngalumoetutulu, 4th Kalaniuvalu-Fotofili (Princess Mele Siu'ilikutapu's husband)
 Honorary Lieutenant of the Royal Victorian Order (LVO)

See also 
 Mirror page : List of honours of the British Royal Family by country

References 

heads of state and royalty
British